James Patrick Michael "Pat" O'Donahue (October 7, 1930 – July 18, 2017) was an American football defensive end in the National Football League. He played for the San Francisco 49ers (1952) and the Green Bay Packers (1955). He played at the collegiate level with the University of Wisconsin.

Biography
O'Donahue was born James Patrick Michael O'Donahue on October 7, 1930 in Eau Claire, Wisconsin. He died in a nursing home near Madison, Wisconsin on July 18, 2017.

See also
Green Bay Packers players

References

1930 births
2017 deaths
Sportspeople from Eau Claire, Wisconsin
Players of American football from Wisconsin
American football defensive ends
Wisconsin Badgers football players
San Francisco 49ers players
Green Bay Packers players